The following items are common Japanese cooking tools used in preparing Japanese cuisine. For a list of general cooking tools see the list of food preparation utensils.

Knives

Deba bōchō: kitchen carver for meat and fish
Fugu hiki, Tako hiki, and yanagi ba: sashimi slicers
Nakiri bocho and usuba bocho: vegetable knives for vegetables
Oroshi hocho and hancho hocho: extremely long knives to fillet tuna
Santoku: general purpose knife influenced by European styles
Udon kiri and soba kiri: knife to make udon and soba
Unagisaki hocho: eel knife

Pots, pans, and bowls
Abura kiri: drainer tray for oils
Agemono nabe: deep frying pot
Donabe: ceramic pot for use on an open flame
Hangiri: rice barrel
Makiyakinabe: rectangular pan for tamagoyaki
Mushiki and seiro: steamers
Otoshi buta: drop lid
Suihanki/rice cooker: electric appliance for cooking rice
suribachi and surikogi: grinding mortar and pestle
Takoyaki pan: frying pan for takoyaki
Tetsubin: cast iron kettle
Tetsunabe: cast iron pot (common for sukiyaki)
Usu and kine: large mortar and pestle for pounding rice

Other kitchen tools

 
Ami jakushi: scoop with a net bottom
Iki jime: awl or spike, used on fish's brain
Katsuobushi kezuriki: mandoline-like device traditionally used to shave katsuobushi
Kushi: skewers
Makisu: bamboo mat for sushi rolls
Oroshigane: graters
Oshizushihako: boxes for pressed sushi
Saibashi: Japanese kitchen chopsticks
Shamoji: rice paddle
Tsukemonoki and tsukemonoishi: Japanese-style pickle press
Urokotori: fish scaler
Zaru: bamboo draining basket

Serving tools
Jūbako: tiered boxes
Shokado bento: bento box

See also
 List of Japanese ingredients
 List of Japanese dishes
 List of Japanese condiments
 List of food preparation utensils

 
Cooking tools